Henry N. Wagner (1927–2012), a former professor at Johns Hopkins University, is one of the pioneering researchers in nuclear medicine.

References 

American nuclear medicine physicians
1927 births
2012 deaths
Johns Hopkins University faculty
Members of the National Academy of Medicine